Dysdera is a genus of woodlouse hunting spiders that was first described by Pierre André Latreille in 1804. They originated from Central Asia to Central Europe.

The family has gained many common names from their individual species, including the "European garden spider", the "slater-eating spider", the "sow-bug killer", the "woodlouse hunter", and the "woodlouse spider".

A bite from one of these spiders can be painful due to their large fangs and wide jaw. It may leave an itchy, swollen, or red bump, but the venom from one of their bites is not harmful to humans.

Description

Their six eyes are close together in an oval shape, and they have eight reddish legs, the second pair facing backward.

Dysdera live in natural shelters, which they wrap by totally white silk. The inhabitants of hot and humid forest will take any potential shelter on or close to the ground. The shelters are used to hide from predators as well as for keeping the spider warm. During the day, they are commonly found taking shelter under objects like gravel with organic material covering it, stones, bark, and occasionally in suburban gardens.

Diet
Dysdera are one of the few known arthropods to hunt and prey on woodlice, one of their main food sources. These spiders have wide jaws and large fangs to help to overcome the solid armor-like shells of woodlice. It makes them powerful predators for their size, allowing them to dominate or kill competitors, such as centipedes or other spiders. D. crocata is the only species from the Dysdera family known to prey on other spiders.

They can also excrete certain enzymes that neutralize the chemical defenses of potential prey, allowing them to subsist on other common ground-dwelling invertebrates, including silverfish, earwigs, millipedes, and small burying beetles. D. unguimannis is considered the most remarkable case of troglomorphism (adaptation to cave life) in the genus Dysdera.

Mating
Mating is mainly done during the month of April. The female is the main caregiver for the young. After mating, the male has minimal to no role in the child rearing process. Before laying the eggs, females will make a silk pouch to protect and give them shelter. She can lay up to seventy eggs at once, and will stay in the silk pouch with the eggs, protecting them and waiting for them to hatch.

Distribution
The D. crocata, D. ninnii, D. dubrovninnii, D. hungarica, and D. longirostris are the five species still found in Central Europe after the last glacial period. They are also abundantly found in North African countries like Morocco and Egypt, but also in Ethiopia, the Iberian Peninsula, and Australia. In the United States, Dysdera crocata is found from New England down to Georgia, and all the way across the country in California. At least two species inhabit South America: D. solers in Colombia- possibly a relict species from the post-miocene era- and D. magna in Brazil, Uruguay, and the central area of Chile.

Canary Islands
These islands house over forty endemic species of Dysdera, thirty-six of which likely descended from a single ancestor, and six of which are associated with the oldest eastern island. On Lanzarote and Fuerteventura, the spider populations are limited to the highest elevation.

The most likely reason that these spiders are so abundant on the Canary Islands is due to the abundance of species on the nearby Iberian Peninsula and North Africas. Groups like Dysdera crocata and Dysdera erythrina, found on two neighboring lands, are found more often than D. lata and Dysdera longirostris, found also in North Africa and Iberia. Over time, these spiders either made their way to the islands or diversified when adapting to the different environments found in the islands.

In total, two to four colonization events are assumed. This probably happened by rafting, or even more likely by transport on floating islands, for Dysdera is not known to use ballooning. Dydera lancerotensis is the only species where an independent origin from continental ancestors is unquestionable; it was originally described as a subspecies of Dysdera crocata.
While some of the remaining Macaronesian archipelagos have been colonized from the Canaries, the Azores have been independently colonized from the continent.

The radiation of Dysdera is surpassed on the Canary Islands only by the snail genus Napaeus, the millipede genus Dolichoiulus, and the beetle genera Attalus and Laparocerus.

Species
 it contains 297 species.

A study published in 2021 used an integrative approach combining morphological and molecular evidence to describe 8 species new to science as well as re-describing and synonymising some existing species.

D. aberrans Gasparo, 2010 – Italy
D. aciculata Simon, 1882 – Algeria
D. aculeata Kroneberg, 1875 – Central Asia, Iran? Introduced to Croatia
D. adriatica Kulczyński, 1897 – Austria, Balkans
D. affinis Ferrández, 1996 – Spain
D. afghana Denis, 1958 – Afghanistan
D. akpinarae Varol, 2016 – Turkey
D. alegranzaensis Wunderlich, 1992 – Canary Is.
D. alentejana Ferrández, 1996 – Portugal
D. ambulotenta Ribera, Ferrández & Blasco, 1986 – Canary Is.
D. anatoliae Deeleman-Reinhold, 1988 – Turkey
D. ancora Grasshoff, 1959 – Italy
D. andamanae Arnedo & Ribera, 1997 – Canary Is.
D. andreini Caporiacco, 1928 – Italy, Albania
D. aneris Macías-Hernández & Arnedo, 2010 – Selvagens Is.
D. anonyma Ferrández, 1984 – Spain
D. apenninica Alicata, 1964 – Italy
Dysdera a. aprutiana Alicata, 1964 – Italy
D. arabiafelix Gasparo & van Harten, 2006 – Yemen
D. arabica Deeleman-Reinhold, 1988 – Oman
D. arabisenen Arnedo & Ribera, 1997 – Canary Is.
D. argaeica Nosek, 1905 – Turkey
D. arganoi Gasparo, 2004 – Italy
D. armenica Charitonov, 1956 – Armenia, Georgia
D. arnedoi Lissner, 2017 – Spain (Majorca)
D. arnoldii Charitonov, 1956 – Central Asia
D. asiatica Nosek, 1905 – Turkey, Iran (?)
D. atlantea Denis, 1954 – Morocco
D. atlantica Simon, 1909 – Morocco
D. aurgitana Ferrández, 1996 – Spain
D. azerbajdzhanica Charitonov, 1956 – Caucasus (Russia, Georgia, Azerbaijan)
D. baetica Ferrández, 1984 – Spain
D. balearica Thorell, 1873 – Spain (Majorca)
D. bandamae Schmidt, 1973 – Canary Is.
D. baratellii Pesarini, 2001 – Italy
D. beieri Deeleman-Reinhold, 1988 – Greece
D. bellimundi Deeleman-Reinhold, 1988 – Montenegro, Albania
D. bernardi Denis, 1966 – Libya
D. bicolor Taczanowski, 1874 – French Guiana
D. bicornis Fage, 1931 – Spain
D. bidentata Dunin, 1990 – Azerbaijan
D. bogatschevi Dunin, 1990 – Georgia, Azerbaijan
D. borealicaucasica Dunin, 1991 – Russia (Caucasus)
D. bottazziae Caporiacco, 1951 – Italy, Croatia
D. breviseta Wunderlich, 1992 – Canary Is.
D. brevispina Wunderlich, 1992 – Canary Is.
D. brignoliana Gasparo, 2000 – Italy
D. brignolii Dunin, 1989 – Turkmenistan
D. caeca Ribera, 1993 – Morocco
D. calderensis Wunderlich, 1987 – Canary Is.
D. castillonensis Ferrández, 1996 – Spain
D. catalonica Řezáč, 2018 – Spain
D. cechica Řezáč, 2018 – Austria, Czechia, Slovakia, Hungary, Serbia?
D. centroitalica Gasparo, 1997 – Italy
D. cephalonica Deeleman-Reinhold, 1988 – Greece
D. cetophonorum (Crespo & Arnedo, 2021) – Azores
D. charitonowi Mcheidze, 1979 – Georgia
D. chioensis Wunderlich, 1992 – Canary Is.
D. circularis Deeleman-Reinhold, 1988 – Greece
D. citauca (Crespo & Arnedo, 2021) – Madeira
D. coiffaiti Denis, 1962 – Madeira
D. collucata Dunin, 1991 – Armenia
D. concinna L. Koch, 1878 – Azerbaijan, Iran (?)
D. corallina Risso, 1826 – Spain, France
D. corfuensis Deeleman-Reinhold, 1988 – Albania, Greece (Corfu)
D. cornipes Karsch, 1881 – Libya
D. cribellata Simon, 1883 – Canary Is.
D. cribrata Simon, 1882 – France, Italy, Andorra
D. cristata Deeleman-Reinhold, 1988 – Syria, Lebanon
D. crocata C. L. Koch, 1838 – Europe, Caucasus, Iraq, Central Asia. Introduced to North America, Chile, Brazil, Australia, New Zealand, Hawaii
Dysdera c. mutica Simon, 1911 – Algeria
Dysdera c. parvula Simon, 1911 – Algeria
D. crocolita Simon, 1911 – Algeria
D. curviseta Wunderlich, 1987 – Canary Is.
D. cylindrica O. Pickard-Cambridge, 1885 – Pakistan
D. daghestanica Dunin, 1991 – Russia (Caucasus)
D. dentichelis Simon, 1882 – Lebanon
D. deserticola Simon, 1911 – Algeria
D. dissimilis Crespo & Arnedo, 2021, 1862 – Madeira
D. diversa Blackwall, 1862 – Madeira
D. dolanskyi Řezáč, 2018 – Spain
D. drescoi Ribera, 1983 – Morocco
D. dubrovninnii Deeleman-Reinhold, 1988 – SE Europe (Balkans), Romania, Slovakia
D. dunini Deeleman-Reinhold, 1988 – Greece, Turkey, Ukraine, Caucasus (Russia, Georgia, Azerbaijan)
D. dushengi (Lin, Chang & Li, 2020) – Kazakhstan, China
D. dysderoides (Caporiacco, 1947) – Ethiopia
D. edumifera Ferrández, 1983 – Spain
D. enghoffi Arnedo, Oromí & Ribera, 1997 – Canary Is.
D. enguriensis Deeleman-Reinhold, 1988 – Turkey
D. erythrina (Walckenaer, 1802) (type) – Southwestern and Western to Central Europe
D. espanoli Ribera & Ferrández, 1986 – Spain
D. esquiveli Ribera & Blasco, 1986 – Canary Is.
D. exigua Crespo & Arnedo, 2021 – Madeira
D. fabrorum Řezáč, 2018 – Spain
D. falciformis Barrientos & Ferrández, 1982 – Spain
D. fedtschenkoi Dunin, 1992 – Tajikistan
D. ferghanica Dunin, 1985 – Kyrgyzstan
D. ferrandezi (Barrientos & Hernández-Corral, 2022) – Spain
D. fervida Simon, 1882 – France (Corsica), Spain (Balearic Is.)?
D. festai Caporiacco, 1929 – Greece (Rhodes)
D. flagellata Grasshoff, 1959 – Italy
D. flagellifera Caporiacco, 1947 – Italy
Dysdera f. aeoliensis Alicata, 1973 – Italy
D. flavitarsis Simon, 1882 – Spain
D. fragaria Deeleman-Reinhold, 1988 – Greece (Rhodes)
D. furcata Varol & Danışman, 2018 – Turkey
D. fuscipes Simon, 1882 – Portugal, Spain, France
D. fustigans Alicata, 1966 – Italy
D. galinae Dimitrov, 2018 – Turkey
D. gamarrae Ferrández, 1984 – Spain
D. garrafensis Řezáč, 2018 – Spain
D. gemina Deeleman-Reinhold, 1988 – Israel
D. ghilarovi Dunin, 1987 – Azerbaijan
D. gibbifera Wunderlich, 1992 – Canary Is.
D. gigas Roewer, 1928 – Greece (Crete)
D. gmelini Dunin, 1991 – Georgia
D. gollumi Ribera & Arnedo, 1994 – Canary Is.
D. gomerensis Strand, 1911 – Canary Is.
D. graia Řezáč, 2018 – France
D. granulata Kulczyński, 1897 – Italy, Balkans, Albania
D. gruberi Deeleman-Reinhold, 1988 – Turkey
D. guayota Arnedo & Ribera, 1999 – Canary Is.
D. halkidikii Deeleman-Reinhold, 1988 – Macedonia, Greece
D. hamifera Simon, 1911 – Algeria
Dysdera h. macellina Simon, 1911 – Algeria
D. hattusas Deeleman-Reinhold, 1988 – Turkey
D. helenae Ferrández, 1996 – Spain
D. hernandezi Arnedo & Ribera, 1999 – Canary Is.
D. hiemalis Deeleman-Reinhold, 1988 – Greece (Crete)
D. hirguan Arnedo, Oromí & Ribera, 1997 – Canary Is.
D. hirsti Denis, 1945 – Algeria
D. hungarica Kulczyński, 1897 – Central Europe to Azerbaijan
Dysdera h. atra Mcheidze, 1979 – Georgia, Azerbaijan
Dysdera h. subalpina Dunin, 1992 – Russia (Caucasus)
D. iguanensis Wunderlich, 1987 – Canary Is.
D. imeretiensis Mcheidze, 1979 – Georgia
D. incertissima Denis, 1961 – Morocco
D. incognita Dunin, 1991 – Russia (Europe, Caucasus)
D. inermis Ferrández, 1984 – Spain
D. inopinata Dunin, 1991 – Georgia
D. insulana Simon, 1883 – Canary Is.
D. isambertoi Crespo & Cardoso, 2021 – Madeira
D. jana Gasparo & Arnedo, 2009 – Italy (Sardinia)
D. karabachica Dunin, 1990 – Azerbaijan
D. kati Komnenov & Chatzaki, 2016 – Greece
D. kollari Doblika, 1853 – Italy, Balkans, Greece, Turkey
D. krisis Komnenov & Chatzaki, 2016 – Greece, Turkey
D. kronebergi Dunin, 1992 – Tajikistan
D. kropfi Řezáč, 2018 – Switzerland
D. kugitangica Dunin, 1992 – Turkmenistan
D. kulczynskii Simon, 1914 – France, Italy
D. kusnetsovi Dunin, 1989 – Turkmenistan
D. labradaensis Wunderlich, 1992 – Canary Is.
D. lagrecai Alicata, 1964 – Italy
D. lancerotensis Simon, 1907 – Canary Is.
D. lantosquensis Simon, 1882 – France, Italy
D. lata Reuss, 1834 – Mediterranean to Georgia
D. laterispina Pesarini, 2001 – Greece
D. leprieuri Simon, 1882 – Algeria
D. levipes Wunderlich, 1987 – Canary Is.
D. ligustica Gasparo, 1997 – Italy
D. limitanea Dunin, 1985 – Turkmenistan
D. limnos Deeleman-Reinhold, 1988 – Greece
D. liostetha Simon, 1907 – Canary Is.
D. littoralis Denis, 1962 – Morocco
D. longa Wunderlich, 1992 – Canary Is.
D. longimandibularis Nosek, 1905 – Turkey, Cyprus
D. longirostris Doblika, 1853 – Central to south-eastern and eastern Europe, Turkey, Caucasus
D. lubrica Simon, 1907 – Egypt
D. lucidipes Simon, 1882 – Algeria
Dysdera l. melillensis Simon, 1911 – Morocco
D. lusitanica Kulczyński, 1915 – Portugal, Spain
D. machadoi Ferrández, 1996 – Portugal, Spain
D. macra Simon, 1883 – Canary Is.
D. madai Arnedo, 2007 – Canary Is.
D. mahan Macías-Hernández & Arnedo, 2010 – Canary Is.
D. maronita Gasparo, 2003 – Lebanon
D. martensi Dunin, 1991 – Caucasus (Russia, Georgia)
D. mauritanica Simon, 1909 – Morocco
Dysdera m. aurantiaca Simon, 1909 – Morocco
D. maurusia Thorell, 1873 – Algeria, Hungary?, Slovakia?, USA?
D. mazini Dunin, 1991 – Armenia, Azerbaijan
D. meschetiensis Mcheidze, 1979 – Georgia
D. microdonta Gasparo, 2014 – Italy, Austria, Slovenia, Serbia
D. mikhailovi (Fomichev & Marusik, 2021) – Tajikistan
D. minairo Řezáč, 2018 – Spain
D. minuta Deeleman-Reinhold, 1988 – Greece (Rhodes)
D. minutissima Wunderlich, 1992 – Canary Is.
D. mixta Deeleman-Reinhold, 1988 – Turkey
D. montanetensis Wunderlich, 1992 – Canary Is.
D. monterossoi Alicata, 1964 – Italy
D. moravica Řezáč, 2014 – Germany to Romania
D. mucronata Simon, 1911 – Morocco, Spain
D. murphyorum Deeleman-Reinhold, 1988 – Albania, Greece (Corfu)
D. nakhchivanica Beydizade, Shafaie & Guseinov, 2018 – Azerbaijan
D. nenilini Dunin, 1989 – Turkmenistan
D. neocretica Deeleman-Reinhold, 1988 – Greece (Crete), Turkey
D. nesiotes Simon, 1907 – Selvagens Is., Canary Is.
D. nicaeensis Thorell, 1873 – France, Italy
D. ninnii Canestrini, 1868 – Switzerland, Italy, Slovenia, Croatia
D. nomada Simon, 1911 – Tunisia
D. nubila Simon, 1882 – France (Corsica), Italy
D. orahan Arnedo, Oromí & Ribera, 1997 – Canary Is.
D. ortunoi Ferrández, 1996 – Spain
D. osellai Alicata, 1973 – Italy
D. paganettii Deeleman-Reinhold, 1988 – Italy
D. pamirica Dunin, 1992 – Tajikistan
D. pandazisi Hadjissarantos, 1940 – Greece
D. paucispinosa Wunderlich, 1992 – Canary Is.
D. pavani Caporiacco, 1941 – Italy
D. pectinata Deeleman-Reinhold, 1988 – Bulgaria, Macedonia, Greece
D. pharaonis Simon, 1907 – Egypt
D. pococki Dunin, 1985 – Turkmenistan
D. pominii Caporiacco, 1947 – Italy
D. portisancti Wunderlich, 1995 – Madeira
D. portsensis Řezáč, 2018 – Spain
D. pradesensis Řezáč, 2018 – Spain
D. praepostera Denis, 1961 – Morocco
D. precaria (Crespo, 2021) – Madeira
D. presai Ferrández, 1984 – Spain
D. pretneri Deeleman-Reinhold, 1988 – Croatia, Montenegro, Greece
D. pristiphora Pesarini, 2001 – Italy
D. punctata C. L. Koch, 1838 – Southern Europe, Slovakia?, Georgia?
D. punctocretica Deeleman-Reinhold, 1988 – Greece (Corfu)
D. pyrenaica Řezáč, 2018 – Spain
D. quindecima Řezáč, 2018 – Spain
D. raddei Dunin, 1990 – Azerbaijan
D. ramblae Arnedo, Oromí & Ribera, 1997 – Canary Is.
D. ratonensis Wunderlich, 1992 – Canary Is.
D. ravida Simon, 1909 – Morocco
D. recondita (Crespo & Arnedo, 2021) – Madeira
D. richteri Charitonov, 1956 – Azerbaijan, Armenia, Georgia
D. roemeri Strand, 1906 – Ethiopia
D. romana Gasparo & Di Franco, 2008 – Italy
D. romantica Deeleman-Reinhold, 1988 – Greece
D. rostrata Denis, 1961 – Morocco
D. rubus Deeleman-Reinhold, 1988 – Turkey, Greece
D. rudis Simon, 1882 – France
D. rugichelis Simon, 1907 – Canary Is.
D. rullii Pesarini, 2001 – Italy
D. sanborondon Arnedo, Oromí & Ribera, 2000 – Canary Is.
D. sandrae (Crespo, 2021) – Madeira
D. satunini Dunin, 1990 – Azerbaijan
D. scabricula Simon, 1882 – France, Spain
D. sciakyi Pesarini, 2001 – Greece
D. seclusa Denis, 1961 – Morocco
D. sefrensis Simon, 1911 – Morocco
D. septima Řezáč, 2018 – Spain
D. shardana Opatova & Arnedo, 2009 – Italy (Sardinia)
D. sibyllina Arnedo, 2007 – Canary Is.
D. sibyllinica Kritscher, 1956 – Italy
D. silana Alicata, 1965 – Italy
D. silvatica Schmidt, 1981 – Canary Is.
D. simbeque Macías-Hernández & Arnedo, 2010 – Canary Is.
D. simoni Deeleman-Reinhold, 1988 – Syria, Israel, Lebanon
D. snassenica Simon, 1911 – Morocco, Algeria
Dysdera s. collina Simon, 1911 – Morocco
D. soleata Karsch, 1881 – Libya
D. solers Walckenaer, 1837 – Colombia
D. spasskyi Charitonov, 1956 – Georgia
D. spinicrus Simon, 1882 – Balkans, Greece, Syria
D. spinidorsa Wunderlich, 1992 – Canary Is.
D. stahlavskyi Řezáč, 2018 – France
D. subcylindrica Charitonov, 1956 – Central Asia
D. subnubila Simon, 1907 – Italy, Tunisia, Egypt
D. subsquarrosa Simon, 1914 – France, Italy
D. sultani Deeleman-Reinhold, 1988 – Greece, Turkey
D. sutoria Denis, 1945 – Morocco
D. tartarica Kroneberg, 1875 – Central Asia
D. tbilisiensis Mcheidze, 1979 – Georgia
D. tenuistyla Denis, 1961 – Morocco
D. teixeirai Crespo & Cardoso, 2021 – Madeira
D. tezcani Varol & Akpınar, 2016 – Turkey
D. tilosensis Wunderlich, 1992 – Canary Is.
D. titanica (Crespo & Arnedo, 2021) – Madeira
D. topcui Gasparo, 2008 – Turkey
D. tredecima Řezáč, 2018 – Spain
D. turcica Varol, 2016 – Turkey
D. tystshenkoi Dunin, 1989 – Turkmenistan
D. ukrainensis Charitonov, 1956 – Ukraine, Russia (Europe), Georgia
D. undecima Řezáč, 2018 – Spain
D. unguimmanis Ribera, Ferrández & Blasco, 1986 – Canary Is.
D. valentina Ribera, 2004 – Spain
D. veigai Ferrández, 1984 – Spain
D. ventricosa Grasshoff, 1959 – Italy
D. vermicularis Berland, 1936 – Cape Verde Is.
D. verneaui Simon, 1883 – Canary Is.
D. vesiculifera Simon, 1882 – Algeria
D. vignai Gasparo, 2003 – Lebanon
D. vivesi Ribera & Ferrández, 1986 – Spain
D. volcania Ribera, Ferrández & Blasco, 1986 – Canary Is.
D. werneri Deeleman-Reinhold, 1988 – Greece
D. westringi O. Pickard-Cambridge, 1872 – Eastern Mediterranean, Iraq
D. yguanirae Arnedo & Ribera, 1997 – Canary Is.
D. yozgat Deeleman-Reinhold, 1988 – Turkey
D. zarudnyi Charitonov, 1956 – Central Asia, Afghanistan
D. zonsteini (Dimitrov, 2021) – Turkmenistan

References

Further reading

External links
Dysdera at BugGuide

Araneomorphae genera
Dysderidae
Invertebrates of North Africa
Spiders of Africa
Spiders of Asia
Taxa named by Pierre André Latreille